This is a list of graph theory topics, by Wikipedia page.

See glossary of graph theory terms for basic terminology

Examples and types of graphs

Graph coloring

Paths and cycles

Trees

Terminology 
Node
Child node
Parent node
Leaf node
Root node
Root (graph theory)

Operations 

Tree structure
Tree data structure
Cayley's formula
Kőnig's lemma
Tree (set theory) (need not be a tree in the graph-theory sense, because there may not be a unique path between two vertices)
Tree (descriptive set theory)
Euler tour technique

Graph limits

 Graphon

Graphs in logic

 Conceptual graph
 Entitative graph
 Existential graph
 Laws of Form
 Logical graph

Mazes and labyrinths

 Labyrinth
 Maze
 Maze generation algorithm

Algorithms

Ant colony algorithm
Breadth-first search
Depth-first search
Depth-limited search
FKT algorithm
Flood fill
Graph exploration algorithm
Matching (graph theory)
Max flow min cut theorem
Maximum-cardinality search
Shortest path
Dijkstra's algorithm
Bellman–Ford algorithm
A* algorithm
Floyd–Warshall algorithm
Topological sorting
Pre-topological order

Other topics

Networks, network theory
See list of network theory topics

Hypergraphs

Helly family
Intersection (Line) Graphs of hypergraphs

Graph theory

Graph theory
Graph theory